Ethmia ditreta is a moth in the family Depressariidae. It is found in Kenya and Yemen.

References

Moths described in 1920
ditreta
Moths of Africa
Moths of the Middle East